Molly Hatchet is the debut studio album by American rock band Molly Hatchet. It was released on September 1, 1978, by Epic Records. The cover is a painting by Frank Frazetta entitled "The Death Dealer". Starting off both the album itself and the recording career of the band, the first song famously begins with lead singer Danny Joe Brown growling "Hell yeah!"

"Dreams I'll Never See" is a cover of The Allman Brothers Band's song "Dreams" from their debut album, via Buddy Miles's reworking of the song from Them Changes (1970).

Track listing 
Side one
 "Bounty Hunter" (Danny Joe Brown, Dave Hlubek, Steve Holland) – 2:58
 "Gator Country" (Hlubek, Holland, Banner Thomas Jerry Moman) – 6:17
 "Big Apple" (Brown, Hlubek) – 3:01
 "The Creeper" (Brown, Bruce Crump, Holland) – 3:18
 "The Price You Pay" (Cecil Berrier, Brown, Holland, Bob Huckaba, JerryLee) – 3:04

Side two
"Dreams I'll Never See" (Gregg Allman) (Jerry Moman Rhythm Guitarist)– 7:06
 "I'll Be Running" (Brown, HlubekI, Moman, Thomas) – 3:00
 "Cheatin' Woman" (JMoman)(Holland) – 3:36
 "Trust Your Old Friend" (Jerry Moman, Crump, Duane Roland) – 3:55

Personnel 
Molly Hatchet
 Danny Joe Brown - vocals
 Dave Hlubek - guitar
 Steve Holland - guitar
 Duane Roland - guitar
 Banner Thomas - bass
 Bruce Crump - drums

Additional musicians
 Tom Werman - percussion
 Jai Winding - keyboards
 Tim Lindsey - additional bass

Production
 Tom Werman - producer, mixing at Record Plant, Los Angeles 
 Anthony Reale - sound engineer, The Sound Pit, Atlanta
 Richard Schoff - sound engineer
 Mike Beriger - assistant engineer 
 Frank Frazetta - cover painting

Charts

Certifications

References 

Molly Hatchet albums
1978 debut albums
Albums produced by Tom Werman
Epic Records albums
Albums with cover art by Frank Frazetta